The Réunion Premier League or Championnat de La Réunion de football is the top division of football on the French overseas territory of Réunion. The league is run and managed by the Réunionese Football League under the watch of the French Football Federation. Réunion Premier League was created in 1950 and the most successful club is JS Saint-Pierroise, who have won 17 league titles. The defending champions are JS Saint-Pierroise. The winner of the competition earns a berth in the CAF Champions League. In the French pyramid system, the Réunion Premier League is positioned in the Division d'Honneur, the sixth level of French football.

The league has produced several professional Ligue 1 players, as well as players who have gone on to have successful careers abroad. Players such as Jean-Pierre Bade, Guillaume Hoarau, Florent Sinama Pongolle, Dimitri Payet, and Jean-Pascal Fontaine all began their careers on the island before achieving success abroad.

Competition format
There are 14 clubs in the Réunion Premier League. During the course of a season, usually from March to November, each club plays the others twice, once at their home stadium and once at that of their opponents, for a total of 26 games. Like all other amateur leagues in France, the league operates using a 4–2–1 points system meaning four points for a win, two for a draw, and one for a defeat. If points are equal following the season, the goal difference and then goals scored determine the winner. If still equal, teams are deemed to occupy the same position. If there is a tie for the championship, for relegation, or for qualification to other competitions, a play-off match at a neutral venue decides rank. The two lowest placed teams are relegated to second division and the top two teams from the second division are promoted in their place.

The Réunionese Football League runs the Coupe de la Réunion, which is the national cup of the territory. The organization also runs a Coupe de France cup competition that is independent to the Coupe de la Réunion. The Coupe de France competition serves as qualifying rounds for the actual Coupe de France. The competition usually lasts six rounds and the winner of the competition qualifies for the 7th round of the Coupe de France.

Premier League Clubs 2016

Previous winners

Performance by club

Top scorers

External links
RSSSF competition history

Football competitions in Réunion
Top level football leagues in Africa
Football leagues in Overseas France
Sports leagues established in 1950
1950 establishments in Réunion